Samcheok Stadium is a multi-purpose stadium in Samcheok, South Korea.  It is currently used mostly for football matches.  The stadium has a capacity of 20,000 people and was opened in 1985. It was home ground of Hyundai Horangi during 1987–1989.

External links
 Samcheok Sports Facilities Management Center 

Sports venues in Gangwon Province, South Korea
Football venues in South Korea
Ulsan Hyundai FC
Multi-purpose stadiums in South Korea